Past perfect is a verb tense which represents actions that occurred before other actions in the past.

Past perfect may also refer to:

 Past Perfect (novel), a 1984 novel by Yaakov Shabtai
 Pastperfect, a 2004 DVD by VNV Nation
 Past Perfect Future Tense, an album by Magne F
 Past Perfect (2003 film), an Italian film
 Past Perfect (1996 film), an action-science fiction film
 PastPerfect, a museum management software by PastPerfect Software Inc.

See also
 Past tense,
 Perfect (grammar),
Past perfect progressive (also known as past perfect continuous)